Ruth Allan Page (née Ross, 23 November 1905 – 13 October 1992) was a New Zealand teacher and pro-railway political activist. She was born in Whangarei, Northland, New Zealand in 1905.

She died in Christchurch in 1992 and was buried in Wakapuaka Cemetery in Nelson.

References

1905 births
1992 deaths
People from Whangārei
New Zealand activists
New Zealand women activists
New Zealand schoolteachers
People educated at Nelson College for Girls
Burials at Wakapuaka Cemetery